Frank A. King was an American football coach.  He served as the head football coach at the University of Arizona for one season in 1913, compiling a record of 2–2.

Head coaching record

References

Year of birth missing
Year of death missing
Arizona Wildcats football coaches